Finding Nemo Submarine Voyage is an attraction in the Tomorrowland area of Disneyland Park in Anaheim, California. It opened on June 11, 2007. Based on the characters and settings of the 2003 Disney·Pixar film, Finding Nemo, it is a re-theming of the classic Submarine Voyage attraction that operated from 1959 to 1998.

History

 
The original Submarine Voyage, built in 1959 as part of the new Tomorrowland, was loosely based on the USS Nautilus, the first nuclear-powered submarine, and its voyage to the North Pole in 1958. On July 29, 1998, it was announced that the ride would be closed on September 7, and that it would reopen with a new theme by 2003.
On its final day of operation, Imagineer Tony Baxter told then-Disneyland president Paul Pressler, "This is one of the worst days of my life." Baxter was one of many Imagineers who campaigned to bring the attraction back with a new theme. 

One of the first attempts to resurrect the subs was to create an attraction based on Disney's 2001 animated film Atlantis: The Lost Empire. A mock-up was built to test the concept; but when the film failed at the box office, those plans were shelved. The next year, an attempt was made to re-theme the attraction on Disney's 2002 animated film Treasure Planet, but it too was a commercial failure. A theme based on Disney's 1989 animated film The Little Mermaid was also briefly considered. During this time, the lagoon remained as scenery. At one point, Disneyland executives considered removing the submarines, feeling they occupied too much of the park's storage space. Imagineering creative chief Marty Sklar hired a naval engineering firm to inspect the subs, and they determined they had 40 to 50 years of life left in them, saving the submarines from destruction.

Eventually, the special effects team at Walt Disney Imagineering developed new projection technology, and around the same time the Pixar animated film Finding Nemo was in development, which had potential for a Submarine Voyage re-theme. Matt Ouimet became the president of Disneyland Resort in 2003, and in 2004 there was new activity in the Submarine lagoon. One of the original eight submarines in the fleet was moored at the old Submarine Voyage dock for inspection by Imagineering. Rumors quickly spread over the Internet that an attraction based on Finding Nemo would replace Submarine Voyage. The submarines were tested to see if new animated show scenes could be visible from their portholes. A mock-up of the new technology was created and a presentation was staged for Ouimet. In spite of the enormous price tag, Ouimet was impressed and the Finding Nemo theme for the Submarine Voyage was green-lighted. It was the first major themepark project for Bob Iger, who became CEO of The Walt Disney Company in 2005, and the first major project for John Lasseter (executive producer of Finding Nemo, and then-chief creative officer of Pixar and Disney Animation) in his role as Principal Creative Advisor for Imagineering.

On July 15, 2005, two days before the 50th Anniversary of Disneyland, the Finding Nemo Submarine Voyage was officially announced at the new Turtle Talk with Crush attraction at Disney California Adventure by then-Walt Disney Parks and Resorts President Jay Rasulo.

For the attraction, the Imagineers used more than 30 tons of recycled crushed glass to "paint" the coral and rockwork in the lagoon. Imagineers also created more than 40 colors for the lagoon area, such as Yamber (a cross between yam and amber), Mango Mud, Toast, Blue Feint (barely blue), Aqua Jazz, Swamp (dark green/amber), Danger Red, Burning Coal, Split Pea, Earth, Phantom and Peritwinkle. The submarines were also converted from diesel fuel to electric power.

In 2008, Finding Nemo Submarine Voyage received an award for outstanding achievement from the Themed Entertainment Association.

On January 6, 2014, the attraction closed and the lagoon drained for extended refurbishment to make improvements to the rockwork and coral. It reopened on September 27, 2014.

Although Disneyland opened on April 30, 2021 from its closure due to the COVID-19 pandemic, the attraction remained temporarily closed. It reopened on July 25, 2022. During its closure, the lagoon was drained and the attraction was refurbished with fresh paint, new coral, kelp, and seaweed, and received enhanced special effects and lighting. In addition, a figure of Hank from the Finding Nemo sequel Finding Dory (2016) was placed on top of a rock in the lagoon.

Voyage

At the attraction's entrance, guests enter the institute of Nautical Exploration and Marine Observation (NEMO). Three seagulls, perched on a nearby buoy, cry out "Mine! Mine! Mine!" every few moments. Guests board one of NEMO's eight yellow research submarines and set out in search of an active underwater volcano. Through their portholes, guests view a colorful underwater environment. One of the first things guests see is Darla, the niece of dentist P. Sherman in Finding Nemo, freediving amid the coral, holding a plastic bag with fish she has captured.

As the journey continues, guests see a giant sea bass swimming through a seaweed forest. The submarines then enter the ruins of an ancient civilization, which are being explored by P. Sherman who is scuba diving. Among the ruins lies a gigantic tiki head, embedded in the ocean floor. The subs then enter a coral reef with many bright reflective colors. Giant clams slowly open and close as the submarines pass. The captain commands the sub to dive much deeper to avoid a surface storm ahead.

At this point the submarine travels through a waterfall and enters the hidden ride building, where guests find themselves apparently moving through underwater caverns. The captain announces that, due to advancements in marine technology, they can use "sonar hydrophones" (an homage to the original attraction), to hear the fish talk. The sub passes through a dark cavern where huge eels lunge toward the submarine, and lobsters can be seen as well. The sub passes Marlin and Dory as they discover that Nemo has gotten lost again. Farther along the reef, guests encounter Mr. Ray and his class swimming through the coral looking for Nemo as well. The first mate announces that the sub is approaching the East Australian Current, and the submarine enters the current along with Nemo, Squirt, Crush and other green sea turtles.

The sub then exits the current and enters a graveyard of sunken ships, Jacques can be seen nearby while Marlin and Dory continue their search for Nemo. Bruce and Chum swim inside a sunken submarine surrounded by mines. The submarine "hits" a mine, causing the mine to explode, resulting in the sub shaking and temporarily losing power. As the sub goes dark, Marlin and Dory are surrounded by small glowing lights, which turn out to be phosphorescent lights on several huge deep-sea anglerfish. After Marlin and Dory escape the creatures, they make their way through a forest of jellyfish.

The submarine reaches the active deep-sea volcano. Gill, Bloat, Gurgle, Bubbles, and Squirt chant as lava flows down the volcano's sides, while Marlin and Dory finally reunite with Nemo. The volcano erupts just as the sub escapes and returns to the reef. The fish gather around and celebrate finding Nemo once again. Suddenly, a pod of humpback whales appears, and one of them swallows both Dory and the submarine. Dory swims about trying to understand the whale's vocalizations. After a few moments, the whale shoots the submarine and Dory out through its blowhole. Dory then mistakes the sub for a "big yellow whale" and speaks whale; saying goodbye.

The captain tells the first mate not to enter anything that has happened in the ship's log because nobody would believe it. He then says they should bring the sub up to the surface "before we have a run-in with a sea serpent or an encounter with a mermaid" (references to the original attraction, which included mermaids and a sea serpent). Two rock formations can be seen, one shaped like a sea serpent's head, and the other shaped like a mermaid. The sub then surfaces and reenters the harbor, where a pair of king crabs snap at air bubbles coming from a sewage pipe. An instrumental version of "Beyond the Sea" plays as the submarine docks and the captain thanks the passengers for riding.

Submarines

The attraction reuses the eight original 1959 Submarine Voyage through Liquid Space attraction vehicle hulls built at the Todd Shipyards in San Pedro, California. Vertical rollers attached at each end of the keel roll within a submerged guide channel. The original diesel engines were replaced by electric battery-powered propulsion units which are charged at the loading dock by contact-less inductive coils, increasing efficiency and eliminating fuel spills. Guests board through a hatch at either end by crossing hinged loading ramps and descending spiral stairs. Twenty aft-boarding guests are seated facing the starboard side and fore-boarding guests are seated facing port. Each submarine originally seated 38 guests, but removal of the diesel engines increased seating to 40 spring-loaded fiberglass seats. Lap sitting of small children is permitted. 46 on-board flotation devices limit maximum capacity to 45 guests and one helmsman. When the boarding ramps are raised the hatches are sealed watertight (but not airtight) and mooring lines released. Although their viewports are below water level, the "submarines" do not actually submerge when "diving". Descent and submersion is simulated with bubbles that rise across the viewports when the vehicles pass through compressed air released under the hull and waterfalls. Each viewport blows fresh dehumidified air across its glass to prevent fogging. Each cabin interior has 40 viewports framed with dark blue mesh, and a wavy blue stripe painted across the ceiling. The original subs's exteriors were painted navy gray; the new livery colors are bright yellow above water, a light blue 'boot stripe' at the waterline, and a reflection-reducing matte blue-black below the waterline.

The sail of each submarine (from which the helmsman operates) has a control console and a board of indicator lights displaying the submarine's operation status if anything abnormal were to happen on the ride's cycle. Cast members on this ride are trained on how to respond to each abnormality, and are always in contact with other operating positions of the ride. Although the submarine is on a guideway, the helmsman controls its forward and backward movement via a small joystick to regulate these speeds (shown in RPM, in lieu of the actual propeller which moves the boat) which vary in different sections of the ride. Cast members operating the submarines must guide the submarine through a series of laser sensors, each which activate a different scene for the show. Guiding timers and block-lights are placed throughout the ride to help the cast member properly time each scene. Helmsmen cast members are also able to unlock the watertight hatches via levers in the sail, which is done each time the boat arrives to dock. Each sail also carries a flashlight, opening/closing checklists for the ride's opening/closing crew, and a radio to communicate with other boats and stations in the attraction.

The queue, docks, subs and scenes were all re-themed to represent the movie's Australian harbor, and the captain and his first mate speak with Australian accents.

Marine Observation Outpost (M.O.O.) – Guests see a show on a high definition LCD screen which is similar to the underwater attraction. This alternative experience is provided to accommodate guests with conditions preventing them from boarding the subs.

Nemo submarine names (2007–)
107 Nautilus
207 Scout, formerly Neptune, formerly Seawolf
307 Voyager, formerly Sea Star, formerly Skate
407 Mariner, formerly Explorer, formerly Skipjack
507 Seafarer, formerly Seeker, formerly Triton
607 Explorer, formerly Argonaut, formerly George Washington
707 Neptune, formerly Triton, formerly Patrick Henry
807 Argonaut, formerly Sea Wolf, formerly Ethan Allen

See also
 Submarine Voyage
 List of Disneyland attractions

References

External links
 
 DisneySubmarines.com
 

Amusement rides introduced in 2007
Audio-Animatronic attractions
Disneyland
Finding Nemo
Pixar in amusement parks
Tomorrowland
Walt Disney Parks and Resorts attractions
2007 establishments in California
Submarine attractions